Tule-Kaweah is a Yokuts dialect of California.

Wukchumni, the last surviving dialect, had only one native or fluent speaker, Marie Wilcox (both native and fluent), who compiled a dictionary of the language.  “Marie's dictionary”, a short documentary by Emmanuel Vaughan-Lee, is about her dictionary. She also recorded an oral version of the dictionary. Together with her daughter Jennifer, Marie Wilcox taught weekly classes to interested members of their tribe. Marie Wilcox died on September 25, 2021.

Dialects
There were three subdialects of Tule-Kaweah, Wukchumni (Wikchamni), Yawdanchi ( Nutaa), and Bokninuwad.

References

External links
Tule-Kaweah at California Language Archive
 Yokuts Languages, Comparison of sounds in Wikchamni and other Yokutsan languages

Yokutsan languages
Endangered Yokutsan languages